In mathematics, the following appear:

 Algebraic point
 Associated point
 Base point 
 Closed point 
 Divisor point
 Embedded point
 Extreme point
 Fermat point
 Fixed point
 Focal point
 Geometric point
 Hyperbolic equilibrium point
 Ideal point
 Inflection point
 Integral point
 Isolated point
 Generic point
 Heegner point
 Lattice hole, Lattice point
 Lebesgue point
 Midpoint
 Napoleon points
 Non-singular point
 Normal point
 Parshin point
 Periodic point
 Pinch point
 Point (geometry)
 Point source
 Rational point
 Recurrent point
 Regular point, Regular singular point
 Saddle point
 Semistable point
 Separable point
 Simple point
 Singular point of a curve
 Singular point of an algebraic variety
 Smooth point
 Special point
 Stable point
 Torsion point
 Vertex (curve)
 Weierstrass point

Calculus
 Critical point (aka stationary point), any value v in the domain of a differentiable function of any real or complex variable, such that the derivative of v is 0 or undefined

Geometry
 Antipodal point, the point diametrically opposite to another point on a sphere, such that a line drawn between them passes through the centre of the sphere and forms a true diameter
 Conjugate point, any point that can almost be joined to another by a 1-parameter family of geodesics (e.g., the antipodes of a sphere, which are linkable by any meridian
 Vertex (geometry), a point that describes a corner or intersection of a geometric shape
 Apex (geometry), the vertex that is in some sense the highest of the figure to which it belongs

Topology
 Adherent point, a point x in topological space X such that every open set containing x contains at least one point of a subset A
 Condensation point, any point p of a subset S of a topological space, such that every open neighbourhood of p contains uncountably many points of S
 Limit point, a set S in a topological space X is a point x (which is in X, but not necessarily in S) that can be approximated by points of S, since every neighbourhood of x with respect to the topology on X also contains a point of S other than x itself
 Accumulation point (or cluster point), a point  of a sequence (xn)n ∈ N for which there are, for every neighbourhood V of x, infinitely many natural numbers n such that xn ∈ V

See also 

 
 
  
 :Category:Triangle centers, special points associated with triangles

Points